Karl Brandl (born 2 May 1912) was an Austrian field hockey player. He competed in the men's tournament at the 1948 Summer Olympics.

References

External links
 

1912 births
Year of death missing
Austrian male field hockey players
Olympic field hockey players of Austria
Field hockey players at the 1948 Summer Olympics
Place of birth missing